Sweet Bird is an album by the American singer Lani Hall. Like many of Hall's albums, Sweet Bird is made up of cover versions of songs.

Track listing 
"Send in the Clowns" (Stephen Sondheim) 2:21
"That’s When Miracles Occur" (Andy Pratt) 3:07
"Early Mornin’ Strangers" (Barry Manilow, Hal David) 3:40
"Mr. Blue (Misty Blue)" (Michael Franks) 3:29
"Too Many Mornings" (Bill Quateman) 4:40
"At the Ballet" (Marvin Hamlisch, Edward Kleban) 6:27
"The Moon Is All Alone (Like Me)" (Michel Colombier, Lani Hall, E. Colombier) 3:22
"Dolphins Lullaby" (Rick Roberts) 4:17
"Sweet Bird" (Joni Mitchell) 2:53

Album credits

Performance credits 
Lani Hall - all vocals
Michel Colombier - all keyboards
Larry Carlton - guitar
Lee Ritenour - guitar
Dennis Budimir - guitar
Chuck Domanico - bass
Stanley Clarke - bass on "Send in the Clowns"
Jim Keltner - drums, percussion
Milt Holland - percussion
Herb Alpert - trumpet solo on "Mr. Blue"

Technical credits 
Michael Boddicker - synthesizer programmer
Bruce Swedien - microphone

References

1977 albums
Albums produced by Herb Alpert
A&M Records albums
Lani Hall albums
Albums recorded at A&M Studios